Vidovec is a village and municipality in Croatia in Varaždin County.

The 2011 census recorded 5,425 inhabitants in the municipality, in the following settlements:

 Budislavec, population 220
 Cargovec, population 410
 Domitrovec, population 272
 Krkanec, population 305
 Nedeljanec, population 1,485
 Papinec, population 110
 Prekno, population 172
 Šijanec, population 213
 Tužno, population 1,015
 Vidovec, population 851
 Zamlača, population 372

The absolute majority of the population are Croats.

External links

References

Municipalities of Croatia
Populated places in Varaždin County